Nationality words link to articles with information on the nation's poetry or literature (for instance, Irish or France).

Events 
 1891–1893 –The Rhymers Club gathers at the Cheshire Cheese in Fleet Street, London, including John Davidson, Ernest Dowson, W. B. Yeats, and others.
c. Late June – In a meeting of decadent poets in London, Oscar Wilde is first introduced to Lord Alfred Douglas by Lionel Johnson at Wilde's Tite Street home.
 Approximate date – Edmund Clerihew Bentley, G. K. Chesterton and fellow pupils of St Paul's School, London, compose the first pseudo-biographical comic verses which become known as clerihews.

Works published in English

Canada
 John Frederic Herbin, Canada, and Other Poems, Canada
 Seranus, Pine, Rose and Fleur De Lis, (Toronto: Hart).

United Kingdom
 Sir Edwin Arnold, The Light of the World; or, The Great Consummation
 Alfred Austin, Lyrical Poems
 John Davidson, In a Music Hall, and Other Poems
 James Joyce, Et tu, Healy, Irish poet published in Ireland
 Arthur Clark Kennedy, Pictures in rhyme
 William McGonagall, Poetic Gems (second series)
 William Morris, Poems by the Way
 May Sinclair, Essays in Verse
 James Kenneth Stephen:
Lapsus Calami
 Quo Musa Tendis
 Katharine Tynan, Ballads and Lyrics

United States
 Thomas Bailey Aldrich, The Sisters' Tragedy
 Nathaniel Ames, The Essays, Humor, and Poems of Nathaniel Ames, published posthumously
 Emily Dickinson, Poems: Second Series
 Oliver Wendell Holmes, Over the Teacups, fiction, nonfiction and poetry
 Herman Melville, Timoleon
 Harriet Monroe, Valeria and Other Poems
 Frank Norris, Yvernelle: A Tale of Feudal France
 Lizette Woodworth Reese, A Handful of Lavender

Other in English
 Henry Lawson, Australia:
 "Freedom on the Wallaby"
 "The Babies of Walloon"

Works published in other languages
 Stefan George, Pilgerfahrten, limited private edition; German
 Francis Jammes, Six Sonnets, France
 Màiri Mhòr nan Òran (Mary MacPherson), Gaelic Songs and Poems, Scottish Gaelic published in the United Kingdom
 Guido Mazzoni, Poesie, Italy

Awards and honors

Births 
Death years link to the corresponding "[year] in poetry" article:
 January 15 – Osip Mandelstam (died 1938), Russian poet and essayist, one of the foremost members of the Acmeist school
 April 9 – Lesbia Harford (died 1927), Australian
 May 15 – David Vogel (killed in concentration camp, 1944), Russian-born Hebrew poet
 May 21 – John Peale Bishop (died 1944), American poet and writer
 May 22
 Johannes R. Becher (died 1958), German poet, novelist and politician
 Edwin Gerard (died 1965), Australian poet
 July 5 – Tin Ujević (died 1955), Croatian poet
 August 19 – Francis Ledwidge (killed in action in World War I, 1917), Irish poet
 September 23 – Arthur Graeme West (killed in action  in World War I, 1917), English military writer and poet
 November 14 – Josef Magnus Wehner (died 1973), German poet and playwright
 November 23 – Masao Kume 久米正雄 writing under the pen-name Santei (died 1952), Japanese, late Taishō period and early Shōwa period playwright, novelist and haiku poet (surname: Kume)
 December 9 – Maksim Bahdanovič (died 1917), Belarusian poet, journalist and literary critic
 December 10 – Nelly Sachs (died 1970), German-Swedish poet and dramatist, winner of the Nobel Prize for Literature in 1966
 Also – Peter Hopegood, born Cedric Hopegood (died 1967), English-born Australian poet

Deaths 
Birth years link to the corresponding "[year] in poetry" article:
 July 24 – Douglas Smith Huyghue (born 1816), Canadian and Australian poet, fiction writer, essayist and artist
 August 12 – James Russell Lowell, 72, American Romantic poet, critic, satirist, writer, diplomat, and abolitionist
 August 14 – John Henry Hopkins, Jr. (born 1820), American clergyman and hymnist
 August 22 – Jan Neruda (born 1834), Czech writer
 September 28 – Herman Melville, 82, American novelist, essayist and poet
 November 10 – Arthur Rimbaud, 37 (born 1854) French poet
 Also:
 Venmani Acchen Nambudiri (born 1817), Indian, Malayalam-language poet associated with the Venmani School of poetry
 Moyinkutty Vaidyar (born 1857), Indian, Malayalam-language poet

See also

 19th century in poetry
 19th century in literature
 List of years in poetry
 List of years in literature
 Victorian literature
 French literature of the 19th century
 Symbolist poetry
 Young Poland (Polish: Młoda Polska) a modernist period in Polish  arts and literature, roughly from 1890 to 1918
 Poetry

Notes

19th-century poetry
Poetry